Stephen R. Greco (December 2, 1919 – February 21, 2000) was an American politician who served in the New York State Assembly from 1959 to 1980.

References

1919 births
2000 deaths
Democratic Party members of the New York State Assembly
20th-century American politicians